Uzalkur Union is an Union Parishad under Rampal Upazila of Bagerhat District in the division of Khulna, Bangladesh. It has an area of 81.20 km2 (31.35 sq mi) and a population of 36,103.

References

Unions of Rampal Upazila
Unions of Bagerhat District
Unions of Khulna Division